Igor Rudan (born 7 March 1971) is a Croatian-British scientist, writer, and science communicator. He creates popular science books and documentaries.

Igor Rudan is a medical doctor with two master’s degrees (in anthropology and epidemiology) and two Ph.D. degrees (in public health and genetic epidemiology). He is a highly cited scientist who published more than 500 research papers, which have received more than 140,000 citations to date and with H-index of 130.

In his early scientific career, he founded the Croatian Biobank “10001 Dalmatians” in isolated populations of Croatian islands in Dalmatia region. The biobank improved understanding of the effects of consanguinity and outbreeding on human health and led to “the outbreeding theory”. It also led to the discovery of a biomedical role for more than 2,000 human genes through genome-wide association studies (GWAS).

In his later career, he focused on international health efforts to reduce global child mortality as the member of Child Health Epidemiology Reference Group (CHERG). He served as a consultant of the World Health Organization, UNICEF, The Bill and Melinda Gates Foundation, The World Bank, Save the Children, and other organizations. He developed the "CHNRI" methodology (in 2007) and EQUIST tool (in 2012). Both have been widely used by international agencies to prioritize investments in global health research and interventions, respectively.

He founded or co-Founded Croatian Centre for Global Health at the University of Split, Croatia (in 2008), Edinburgh University Global Health Society (in 2011), Journal of Global Health (in 2011), World Health Organization's Collaborating Centre for Population Health Research and Training (in 2013), Centre for Global Health at the University of Edinburgh (in 2015), Journal of Global Health Reports (in 2017) and the International Society of Global Health (in 2019).

He is most widely known for his popularizing of biomedical science. In 2017 he completed a documentary series "Survival: The Story of Global Health" which was broadcast on Croatian National TV and seen by more than 1 million people. He published four No. 1 national bestsellers in popular science in Croatia: The Exact Colour of the Sky: The Story of Science (in 2017), Evil Air: The Story of Medicine (in 2018), In the Land of Clans: The Story of Adaptation (in 2019) and Awaiting the Fires: The Story of Sustainability (in 2020).

He was included among ISI/Thomson Reuters "World's Most Influential Scientific Minds" and received awards including the Wellcome Trust's International Research Development Award (in 2002), "Scientist of the Year" Award from The Croatian Parliament (in 2005), Visiting Professorship for Senior International Researchers from the Chinese Academy of Sciences (in 2012), The Chancellor's Award for Research (in 2012) and Principal’s Medal (in 2019). In 2016, he was elected a Fellow of the Royal Society of Edinburgh (FRSE). In 2020 he was the adviser to the Croatian Government for COVID-19 response and he launched a health education campaign on the pandemics which reached up to three million people in eight countries.

Early life and education
Igor Rudan was born in Zagreb, Croatia's capital in 1971, which was then a city in the former Yugoslavia. His father Nikola Rudan, was a surgeon at the Institute for Tumours and Allied Diseases in Zagreb. His mother Tatjana (nee Valić) was a concert pianist. His uncle Pavao Rudan, Nikola's younger brother, was an anthropologist and an eminent Croatian scholar who later became Secretary-General of the Croatian Academy of Sciences and Arts. Their father and Rudan's grandfather, Mario Rudan, was a judge of the Croatian Supreme Court, while his wife Lucija (nee Perinić) was a school teacher and a well-known Croatian poet. Family Rudan originates from the village of Bogomolje on the island of Hvar, Croatia.

Igor Rudan attended the primary school Veljko Vlahović in Krajiška Street in Zagreb from 1977 until 1985. He took part in several state championships in mathematics, physics, and chess from 1983 to 1985. He also represented his school at the Zagreb city championships in swimming and athletics [5,6]. In 1985 he joined the High School for Mathematics and Computer Science (MIOC) in Zagreb, where he was top of his class. This led him to take up the offer for the "Open Door" exchange program to finish his final of high school in the United States. From 1988 until 1989 he attended West Charlotte High School in Charlotte, North Carolina. There, he was the single awardee of the Annual School Award for Mathematics in 1989. He was also awarded as the high school top unrated player at the chess championship of North Carolina.

University education 
He graduated from Zagreb University of Medicine in 1995.

From 1989-1995 he returned to Zagreb to study medicine at the University Medical School. He studied during the period of the Homeland War in Croatia (1991-1995) and obtained a degree of Medical Doctor (M.D.) as the joint top of his class. He also engaged in cancer research with his father Nikola Rudan and with Professor Marija Strnad, the head of the Cancer Registry of Croatia. This collaboration resulted in more than 20 research papers, case reports, and case series published between 1992 and 1995. He led this research as a medical student, publishing the results mainly in Croatian journals Libri Oncologici and Acta Medica Croatica.

During his medical studies, he was awarded the Annual Award from the Principal (Rector) of the University of Zagreb for the best student scientific article in the academic year 1992/93 and 1993/94. He was also awarded the Scholarship for the 50 most successful students from the University of Zagreb in 1993 and 1994 and the Scholarship of the City of Zagreb for the 20 most successful students in 1994. Later in 1994, he received the main Award for Presentation at the annual conference of the European Medical Students Association (EMSA) in Prague, Czech Republic.

He continued his postgraduate education at the University of Zagreb. Mentored by Dr Branka Janicijevic from the Institute for Anthropological Research in Zagreb, he obtained the Master's of Science (M.Sc.) degree from the University of Zagreb in 1997. This was for the study of the effects of consanguinity and inbreeding on cancer incidence in Croatian island isolate populations. A year later, in 1998, he obtained the Doctor of Science (D.Sc.) degree from the University of Zagreb Medical School. Mentored by Professor Silvije Vuletić from the School of Public Health "Andrija Štampar", he studied the effects of isonymy and ancestral kinship on cancer in a remote island of Lastovo, Croatia, based on the reconstruction of genealogies for six generations of the local population.

In 1999 he joined the European School for Advanced Studies at the University of Pavia, Italy. Mentored by Professor Nadia Ranzani, he obtained a Master's degree in Public Health (M.P.H.) for a genetic epidemiological analysis of familial clusters of cancer on the island of Lastovo, Croatia. In 2000 and 2001 he received British Scholarship Trust (BST) Fellowship, Overseas Research Scheme (ORS) Fellowship, and the Ph. D. fellowship from the University of Edinburgh. This allowed him to move to the United Kingdom and complete his Ph.D. in genetic epidemiology in 2005. Mentored by Professor Harry Campbell, he studied the effects of inbreeding and consanguinity on human quantitative traits and complex common diseases of late-onset.

He presently works as a Professor of International Health and Molecular Medicine and joint Director of the Centre for Global Health and World Health Organization's Collaborating Centre for Population Health Research and Training at the University of Edinburgh. As of August 2020, he published more than 530 research articles and 10 books. Based on Google Scholar, he received more than 135,000 citations and has H-index of 129.

Career in genetic research 
After obtaining his first doctorate in 1999, Igor Rudan started to develop the biobank called “10,001 Dalmatians”. At the time, this was a very rare DNA-based human biobank in a middle-income country. This resource for genetic epidemiological studies was established in a series of genetic isolate islands off the coast of Dalmatia region in Croatia. In 2001 he received the International Research Development Award from The Wellcome Trust for his research and vision. Further development of this biobank was achieved through collaboration with Professors Harry Campbell from the University of Edinburgh and Alan F. Wright from the Human Genetics Unit of the Medical Research Council (MRC) in Edinburgh.

The outbreeding theory: Studying the effects of human inbreeding and admixture 
Rudan's early work focused on studying the effects of inbreeding and admixture on human health and disease. At the time, in early 2000s, one of the central questions relevant to gene mapping was to predict the genetic architecture of complex quantitative biological traits that underlie common late-onset diseases. Most research of that period assumed that it was "oligogenic", i.e. that only a handful of genes would confer the majority of genetic risk for complex quantitative traits and diseases. Using inbreeding studies and very elegant designs within his PhD research, Rudan and his colleagues showed that the genetic architecture of those traits must be highly polygenic, with at least several hundred loci contributing to genetic risk of human hypertension and late-onset diseases.

These studies, published in 2003, were entirely against the predominant thinking. This made them were very difficult to publish. Their implications were summarized in a review published by the influential scientific journal Trends in Genetics in 2003. A decade later, hundreds of genome-wide association studies have shown beyond any doubt that the genetic architecture of human quantitative traits and common complex diseases of late-onset is highly polygenic. Rudan's work on studying the effects of inbreeding and admixture on human disease was continued at the University of Edinburgh through the PhD theses by Ozren Polasek, Ruth McQuillan, and Peter Joshi. After 16 years of continuous research, it resulted in a paper in Nature, demonstrating effects on stature and cognition in diverse human populations. Based on these results, Rudan proposed "the outbreeding theory", i.e. that large human movements, migrations and urbanization may be partly driving, through so-called "hybrid vigor", the observed secular trends, improvements in public health indicators and human lifespan.

10001 Dalmatians: Genome-wide association studies of quantitative traits 
Rudan developed the resource "10001 Dalmatians" with the help of his close collaborators Harry Campbell and Ozren Polašek. The biobank mainly comprised the examinees from the islands of Vis and Korčula in Dalmatia, Croatia. With the advent of "chips" for genome-wide scans developed by the company Illumina, genome-wide association studies became possible and the Croatian resource was among the first to carry them out. However, due to a highly polygenic nature of the studied traits, gene discovery required very large sample sizes. This led to many European and global biobanks joining together to form large collaborative consortia. Their work led to hundreds of original research papers, many of which were published in the leading science journals - Nature, Science or Nature Genetics.

In collaboration with other international biobanks, the "10001 Dalmatians" resource contributed to the discovery of several thousands of human genetic variants that were associated with quantitative biological traits and complex diseases. Igor Rudan co-led the discovery of the SLC2A9 gene variants that were associated with uric acid levels and gout disease. In collaboration with Professor Gordan Lauc from the University of Zagreb, he also co-led the first two studies that identified genetic variants associated with human N-glycans levels.

Career in global health 
Since March 2001, Rudan has been working as a Technical Expert within the Child Health Epidemiology Reference Group (CHERG) of the World Health Organization and UNICEF. This influential group of researchers led the "child survival revolution" in the 21st century and made important contributions that reduced global child mortality.

Child survival - United Nation's Millennium Development Goal 4 
Igor Rudan's contributions to the CHERG work included leading a systematic assessment to identify gaps in child health information globally and producing several reports on the global burden of pediatric infectious diseases, such as clinical pneumonia and diarrhea and meningitis. He also contributed to several influential estimates of the causes of global child mortality. Working with Professor Harry Campbell, he developed guidelines for performing community-based studies of childhood infections and evaluated existing and emerging interventions.

CHNRI method - setting global research priorities 
Working as a consultant for Child Health and Nutrition Research Initiative (CHNRI) of the Global Forum for Health Research and funded mainly by the World Bank, Igor Rudan developed and implemented a systematic methodology for setting priorities in global health research investments. The CHNRI methodology has been implemented by many international organizations and countries to identify research priorities, resulting in more than 100 reports in leading journals to date. It became the most widely used method to set health research priorities in the 21st century.

EQUIST tool - prioritising investments in global health 
Working as a consultant for UNICEF, Igor Rudan co-developed a method to address investment prioritization in health care and health interventions - Equitable Impact Sensitive Tool (EQUIST). The EQUIST tool was used by international organisations and national governments to conduct scenario analyses and identify priority populations, bottlenecks and operational strategies to reduce maternal and child mortality. EQUIST helps stakeholders to develop evidence-based, equitable and cost-effective national health strategies. In 2012-2013, the EQUIST model was expanded by UNICEF into a more user-friendly global data science platform. EQUIST has been used as a basis for Investment Case Studies required by a new global financial initiative called Global Financing Facility (GFF) launched in 2015 to finance the Sustainable Development Goals.

Journal of Global Health 
In 2011, Igor Rudan founded a scientific journal - The Journal of Global Health - with two co-editors-in-chief. It was launched on the occasion of the 19th World Congress of Epidemiology. In 2017, he also founded Journal of Global Health Reports. Since 2019, both journals are officially published by the International Society of Global Health.

Global Health Epidemiology Research Group - global health metrics 
With the launch of the new journal, Igor Rudan extended the CHERG work to non-communicable diseases through establishing a global academic collaboration - Global Health Epidemiology Reference Group (GHERG). He assembled and lead the “CHI Consortium” (CHI = China Health Information) and studied reports of Chinese researchers stored in searchable electronic databases in Chinese. He was also a co-developer of GATHER guidelines (Guidelines for Accurate and Transparent Health Estimates Reporting). Notable results of GHERG include the first estimates of child mortality causes in China and dementia prevalence in China, and the global epidemiological estimates for peripheral artery disease (PAD), carotid atherosclerosis and chronic obstructive pulmonary disease (COPD).

International Society of Global Health - co-founder and inaugural President 
In 2019, Igor Rudan co-founded the International Society of Global Health (ISoGH) and was elected the inaugural President. The society aims to promote global health as a field of scientific research and health care practice nationally and internationally. It produces and disseminates information relating to global health research and practice. Also, it trains and expands the general pool of professionals skilled in global health research and practice.

In November 2020, for the fourth year, he was listed in the Highly Cited Researchers 2020 list. He has a new book being worked on, The First Wave, about the coronavirus pandemic.

Career in public communication of science 

In 2016, Rudan became a science communicator. Supported by The Wellcome Trust and BBC Scotland, he developed a documentary series Survival: The Story of Global Health (2017). He published a series of 52 columns called 21st century in Vecernji list in 2017-18; then, a series of 28 columns called Human organism in Vecernji list in 2018-19. This was followed by a series of 10 columns called "Sustainability of our world in Index.hr in 2019. Then, he wrote a series of 17 columns in Vecernji list in 2020 called Survival: The Story of Global Health (all of them were in Croatian). Simultaneously, he wrote a 4-book popular science Tetralogy on the 21st century, which contained the books The Exact Colour of the Sky (2017), Evil Air (2018), In the Land of Clans (2019) and Awaiting the Fires (2020). All four books became No. 1 national bestsellers in Croatia.

Role in COVID-19 pandemic response 
During the COVID-19 pandemic, Igor Rudan engaged in several roles. He was a scientific adviser to the Government of Croatia in planning the COVID-19 response in Croatia. From his already established position of science communicator, he also launched a massive health education campaign, writing columns about the pandemic for Vecernji list. They were followed by up to 3 million people in all six countries of the former Yugoslavia, in the United Kingdom and the United States, and published in other countries in other international outlets.

He was active as an editor-in-chief of theJournal of Global Health, where many reports on the national-level response on COVID-19 were reviewed and published. He also wrote a number of notable editorials and research articles on COVID-19 pandemic.

Awards and recognitions 
 2016 - Fellow of the Royal Society of Edinburgh (FRSE)
2019 - Principal's Medal for Outstanding Service
2012 - Chancellor's Award for Research
2005 - National Science Award, The Parliament of the Republic of Croatia
2015-2020 - Clarivate Analytics / Web of Science's Highly Cited Researcher (Top 0.1% in the World by Citations)
2017-2019 - Listed among "100 Most Powerful Croatians"

Television 
In 2017,  Rudan co-developed a documentary series on global health called Survival: The Story of Global Health. He wrote the script and narrated the series. The series has 10 episodes and lasts for about 2 hours. It was then broadcast on Channel 1 of Croatian National Television in October and November 2018 and it cumulatively attracted 1.4 million viewers. The series was broadcast again during the COVID-19 pandemic in early 2020.

Personal life 
Igor Rudan has dual Croatian and British citizenship  and lives with his partner Tonkica Zlački. He has two children.

Selected publications
 Šamija M, Šarčević B, Rudan I (1997): Rijetki tumori (Uncommon tumors). Zagreb: Globus, pp. 1–235. (in Croatian). .
 
 Rudan I (1999). Mjesec improvizatora: roman. (Month of an Improviser: A novel). Med-Info Consulting, Zagreb, pp. 1–268. (in Croatian). .
 
 Smoljanović M, Smoljanović A, Rudan I (2009): Croatian Island Populations in 2001. Zagreb: LaserPlus, pp. 1–577. .
 
 Vorko-Jović A, Strnad M, Rudan I (2010): Epidemiologija kroničnih nezaraznih bolesti (Epidemiology of chronic non-communicable diseases). Zagreb: Medicinska Naklada, pp. 1–296. (in Croatian). .
 
 Rudan I, Sridhar D (2015): Healthy ideas: Improving global health and development in the 21st century. Edinburgh: JoGH, pp. 1–440. .
 
 Rudan I (2017): Točna boja neba: Razmišljanja o znanosti u 21. stoljeću (The Exact Colour of the Sky: Thoughts on Science in the 21st Century). Zagreb: Naklada Ljevak, pp. 1–355 (in Croatian). .
 
 Rudan I (2018): Zao zrak: Razmišljanja o zdravlju i bolesti u 21. stoljeću (Evil Air: Thoughts on Health and Disease in the 21st Century). Zagreb: Naklada Ljevak, pp. 1–451 (in Croatian). .
 
 Rudan I (2019): U zemlji klanova: Razmišljanja o prilagodbi u 21. stoljeću (In the Land of Clans: Thoughts of Adaptation in the 21st Century). Zagreb: Naklada Ljevak, pp. 1–356 (in Croatian). .
 
 Rudan I, Chan KY, Campbell H, Guo Y (2019, Editors): Elevation: Understanding China's Health Transition in the 21st Century. Edinburgh: JoGH, .
 Rudan I (2020): Očekujući vatre: Razmišljanja o izazovima u 21. stoljeću (Awaiting the Fires: Thoughts of the Challenges in the 21st Century). Zagreb: Naklada Ljevak, pp. (in Croatian). .

References

External links 
 igorrudan.com
 https://www.youtube.com/channel/UCyxRuuY1APjPsJzJc89dKOg
 https://www.youtube.com/channel/UC4JAVZRQxSTfy65AOJ4Uqqg/videos
 https://www.youtube.com/channel/UCKMDe0Yi6SwfUNCXvXdogzA/videos
 https://medium.com/@irudan
 https://www.vecernji.hr/tag/igor-rudan-160282
 https://twitter.com/ProfIgorRudan

1971 births
Living people
Academics of the University of Edinburgh
Physicians from Zagreb
Croatian medical researchers